Constructive Destruction is an album by the Flying Luttenbachers. It was released in 1994 by ugEXPLODE.

Critical reception
The Chicago Tribune called the album a "timeless barrage of guitars, drums and saxophones straining to break free from conventional song structure." CMJ New Music Monthly deemed it "splintery, celebratory jazz played with hardcore punk velocity and intensity."

Track listing

Personnel 
Jeb Bishop – bass guitar, trombone
Chad Organ – tenor saxophone
Dylan Posa – guitar
Weasel Walter – drums
Ken Vandermark – tenor saxophone, soprano clarinet, bass clarinet

References

External links 
 

1994 debut albums
The Flying Luttenbachers albums